What We Believe But Cannot Prove: Today's Leading Thinkers on Science in the Age of Certainty is a non-fiction book edited by literary agent John Brockman with an introduction by novelist Ian McEwan and published by Harper Perennial. The book consists of various responses to a question posed by the Edge Foundation, with answers as short as one sentence and as long as a few pages. Among the 107 published contributors are notable scientists and philosophers as Richard Dawkins, Daniel C. Dennett, Jared Diamond, Rebecca Goldstein, Steven Pinker, Sir Martin Rees and Craig Venter; as well as upcoming convicted sex offenders like Jeffrey Epstein. Some contributions weren't published, including those by Benoit Mandelbrot and computer scientist John McCarthy. However, their contributions are among 120 responses available online.

Overview 
Each year, the Edge Foundation poses a question on its website to members of the "third culture", defined by Brockman as "those scientists and other thinkers...who, through their work and expository writing, are taking the place of the traditional intellectual in rendering visible the deeper meanings of our lives, redefining who and what we are".

Synopsis 
The essays cover a broad range of topics, including evolution, the workings of the human mind, and science itself. A common focus of responders are the issue of extra-terrestrial life and the question of whether humanity has a supranatural element beyond flesh and blood. Among the more esoteric topics is the question of cockroach consciousness.

A pervasive theme, according to Publishers Weekly, is the discomfort responders felt in professing unproven beliefs, which Publishers Weekly declared "an interesting reflection of the state of science". The question inspired implicit or explicit reflection in a number of responders about the scientific method's reliance on observable, empirical and measurable evidence, with a good many of what The Observer points out as largely American responders defending against "the return to an age of uncertainty in which creationism and intelligent design hold sway in the public mind". "What's really at stake here", Wired said in its review, "is the nature of 'proof' itself".<ref>Hillner, Jennifer. (April 2006) Print: What We Believe But Cannot Prove Wired. Retrieved 2008-05-24.</ref>

 Reception 
Reviews of What We Believe But Cannot Prove were primarily positive. The Boston Globe described the book as "astounding reading", stating that "taken as a whole, this little compendium of essays will send you careening from mathematics to economics to the moral progress of the human race, and it is marvellous to watch this muddle of disciplines overlap". In Paste Magazine's "Best Books of 2007" column, in which 13 notable authors were asked each to recommend a favorite book, Esquire columnist Tom Junod described it as "at once rigorous, exquisitely reasoned, untainted by mysticism, somewhat useless, and altogether mindblowing". The Skeptical Inquirer stated that the book "offers an impressive array of insights and challenges that will surely delight curious readers, generalists, and specialists alike".

Several reviews focused positively on the invitation to speculate afforded respondents and the insight their speculations may offer into the future of scientific discourse. Science News and The Guardian described the book respectively as "a tantalizing glimpse into the future of human inquiry" and "[s]cientific pipedreams at their very best".Smith, PD. (August 19, 2006) Truth believers. The Guardian. Retrieved on 2008-05-24. The Daily Telegraph praised the book as "refreshing" and "intriguing and unexpected", noting that "[b]y unleashing scientists from the rigours of established method we gain fascinating glimpses into the future directions of arcane disciplines few fully understand".

While still generally positive, some reviewers criticized certain aspects of the book, including redundancy and tone. The Observer described the essays as "compelling and repetitive by turns". Publishers Weekly referred to the collection as "stimulating", but found it "unfortunate that the tone of most contributions isn't livelier and that there aren't explanations of some of the more esoteric concepts discussed", limitations which would "keep these adroit musings from finding a wider audience."

 See also The Third CultureWhat Is Your Dangerous Idea?: Today's Leading Thinkers on the Unthinkable Notes 

 References 
Brockman, John (2006). What We Believe But Cannot Prove: Today's Leading Thinkers on Science in the Age of Certainty''. New York: Harper Perennial. .

Further reading

External links
Thinkers lay out the beliefs they can't prove, NPR discussion.
The World Question Center 2005 , where the original question was posed. Has 10 pages of the 120 contributions received and author biographies plus media coverage, that include unpublished responses by Benoit Mandelbrot and others.

2006 non-fiction books
2006 anthologies
Essay anthologies
Science books
Philosophy books
Books by John Brockman